Mertensophryne nyikae (common name: Nyika dwarf toad) is a species of toad in the family Bufonidae. It is endemic to the Nyika Plateau of northern Malawi and adjacent northeastern Zambia.
Its natural habitats are montane forests and nearby wet, boggy grasslands at approximately  asl. Breeding takes place in small, shallow pools. Although its range is mostly (possibly entirely) within relatively well managed protected areas, habitat loss remains a potential threat.

References

nyikae
Frogs of Africa
Amphibians of Malawi
Amphibians of Zambia
Taxa named by Arthur Loveridge
Amphibians described in 1953
Taxonomy articles created by Polbot